Nicolina Elizabeth Farruggia (1 June 1951 – 18 January 2019), popularly as Lena Farugia, was an American-born South African actress, screenwriter, director and producer. She is best known for the roles in the films The Gods Must Be Crazy II and The Sandgrass People.

Personal life

Farugia was born on 1 June 1951 and grew up in Westchester County, New York, USA. Her father, Giuseppe Farruggia, was a supervisor for the Penn Central railroad company. Her mother, Grazia "Grace" Grassi, was a designer with a fashion house. She studied at Thomas Moore College, and dance from Fordham University. She later completed her MA in history from Columbia University.

In 1977, she married South African filmmaker, Robert Davies, but later divorced. Then on 28 August 1996, she married again.

Farugia died on 18 January 2019 in South Africa at the age of 67.

Career

After joining with some theatre works, she followed courses in film editing at The New School in Greenwich Village. In the meantime, she acted in Broadway and dinner theatre productions. After the marriage, she moved to South Africa with her then husband and started acting again. In 1976, she starred in a French television series Les Diamants du Président. Then in 1977, she moved to South Africa and acted in the film Mister Deathman. Along with her then husband, she formed the production company "Davnic Productions". In 1987, they produced the drama Saturday Night at the Palace directed by Davies. In 1981 and 1982, she joined the first two seasons of the television series Westgate, both directed by Edgar Bold.

In 1989, she played the female lead role as "Dr. Ann Taylor" in the blockbuster movie The Gods Must Be Crazy II directed by Jamie Uys. After that success, she played another lead role as "Elizabeth Carter" in the film The Sandgrass People directed by Koos Roets. In 2005, she scripted, directed and edited the documentary film An African in Paris. Other than cinema and television, she performed in many stage plays such as: Cat on a Hot Tin Roof (1982), Agnes of God (1983) and Extremities (1984). In 1989, she wrote and acted in the play We and Them.

Filmography

References

External links
 

1951 births
2019 deaths
American emigrants to South Africa
Naturalised citizens of South Africa
South African film actresses
White South African people
South African television actresses
Actresses from New York City
American people of Italian descent
South African people of Italian descent
21st-century American women